Deh Now-e Salar (also Romanized as Deh Now-e Sālār; also known as Deh Now) is a village in Takab Rural District, Shahdad District, Kerman County, Kerman Province, Iran. At the 2006 census, its population was 284, in 63 families.

References 

Populated places in Kerman County